Heard Well is an American music label founded in 2015 by Connor Franta, Andrew Graham and Jeremy Wineberg. The label focuses exclusively on producing compilation albums featuring undiscovered artists as curated by digital influencers and celebrities.

Overview
Heard Well works with social influencers and celebrities to curate compilation albums of their favorite music. After licensing the music, the label, in tandem with the influencer, bring it to market both digital and physical form. The label is the first music company powered by social tastemakers and their communities.

History
In November 2014 YouTube personality Connor Franta created and released a compilation album titled Crown, which went on to become one of the top 20 best-selling pop albums of 2014 on iTunes. Subsequently, Franta released a second compilation album several months later. By July 2015 Franta formalized the project by founding Heard Well as a music label with Jeremy Wineberg, owner of the music distribution and licensing company Opus Label, as well as then talent manager and now agent, Andrew Graham. One month later, Franta produced and released the label's first album, Common Culture, Vol. 3.

In 2015, Heard Well created the soundtrack for Gayby Baby, an Australian documentary about marriage equality. That same year, Heard Well produced an album by Anthony Quintal (a.k.a. Lohanthony) entitled "Landscapes."

In June 2016 Heard Well signed author, activist and podcast host Tyler Oakley to create a 13-track compilation album called Pride Jams, which celebrated LGBT Pride month. As of August 2016 each album released by Heard Well charted in the Billboard Top 200, and sold thousands of copies.

By May 2017, Heard Well had signed twelve of YouTube's most subscribed to personalities, with an average following of 3.8 million people. Signees include JC Caylen, Tyler Oakley, Amanda Steele, Tom Cassell and others.

Heard Well Radio
In April 2017, Heard Well launched Heard Well Radio with online radio company TuneIn.

Creators
 Tom Cassell
 JC Caylen
 Gabby Douglas
 Tyler Oakley
Anthony Quintal
 Amanda Steele
Tanner Braungardt
 Andrea Russett
 The Dolan Twins
Annie LeBlanc
 LUKA
Camille Kostek

References

External links

American record labels
American independent record labels
Companies based in Los Angeles
Record labels established in 2015